A minor party is a political party that plays a smaller (in some cases much smaller, even insignificant in comparison) role than a major party in a country's politics and elections. The difference between minor and major parties can be so great that the membership total, donations, and the candidates that they are able to produce or attract are very distinct. Some of the minor parties play almost no role in a country's politics because of their low recognition, vote and donations. Minor parties often receive very small numbers of votes at an election (to the point of losing any candidate nomination deposit). The method of voting can also assist or hinder a minor party's chances.  For example, in an election for more than one member, the proportional representation method of voting can be advantageous to a minor party as can preference allocation from one or both of the major parties.

A minor party that follows the direction/directive of some other major parties is called a bloc party or satellite party.

Australia

Minor parties in Australia owe much of their success to the proportional representation method of voting.  This allows minor parties to achieve at least one quota in the electorate or state and thus gain representation in a parliamentary chamber.  Often minor parties have been so successful in gaining such representation that they are able to hold the balance of power in the particular house of the parliament (usually the Australian Senate).  Some examples are the Democratic Labor Party (DLP) in the 1960s and early 1970s, the Australian Democrats from the late 1970s until 2004, and more recently the Australian Greens.

United Kingdom

The use of first past the post in the United Kingdom means that in the post-War era, only two parties have had a majority in parliament: the Conservative Party and the Labour Party. However, strong regionalist movements and the potential for parties to take votes in the centre or extreme fringes of the political spectrum mean that minor parties still play a significant and increasing role in British politics. The Liberal Democrats, and their predecessors the SDP–Liberal Alliance and the Liberal Party (the main opposition to the Conservative Party before the rise of Labour, forming governments six times between 1859 and 1918) have achieved significant numbers of seats and have occasionally been kingmakers (such as during the Lib-Lab pacts and the 2010–2015 coalition with the Conservatives) and are sometimes also classed as a major party. The nationalist Scottish National Party and Plaid Cymru hold a significant number of seats in their Home Nations, with the SNP controlling 56 of 59 Scottish Westminster seats at the 2015 United Kingdom general election, and every single Northern Irish seat is held by a regional party – either the republican Sinn Féin and Social Democratic and Labour Party, or the unionist Ulster Unionist Party and Democratic Unionist Party. As of 2019, the Green Party hold one seat and the Brexit Party is the largest British party in the European Parliament, despite holding no seats in the House of Commons. Also UKIP has achieved significant vote shares despite holding no seats in the Commons.

Other parties that have held seats in devolved assemblies, the House of Commons or the European Parliament in the 21st century include the non-sectarian Northern Irish Alliance Party, the far right British National Party, the healthcare-focused Independent Community and Health Concern, the cross-community Northern Irish NI21, the cross-community feminist Northern Ireland Women's Coalition, the anti-austerity People Before Profit Alliance, the left-wing Northern Irish unionist Progressive Unionist Party, the left wing Respect Party, the left wing nationalist Scottish Socialist Party, the elderly interest Scottish Senior Citizens Unity Party and the unionist Northern Irish Traditional Unionist Voice and UK Unionist Party.

Whether or not a party counts as a major party is a sometimes heated argument, since "major parties" as defined by Ofcom are entitled to more party political broadcasts than minor ones. Because of the regionalist nature of many parties, it is possible to be a major party in one part of the country and not another: for example, at one point UKIP was officially a major party in England and Wales, but a minor one in Scotland. No mainland British party is classed as a major party in Northern Ireland.

A minor party is also a special type of political party registered with the Electoral Commission in Great Britain that is able to contest only parish and community council elections in England and Wales and has fewer reporting, financial and administrative requirements than an ordinary registered political party.

United States

In the United States, minor parties are often described as third parties. Minor parties in the U.S. include the Libertarian Party, the Green Party, Constitution Party, and others that have less influence than the major parties. Since the American Civil War (1861–1865), the major parties have been the Republican Party and the Democratic Party. Since 1860, six presidential candidates other than Republicans and Democrats have received over 10% of the popular vote, although one of them was a former president, Theodore Roosevelt.

Third party 
In electoral politics, a third party is any party contending for votes that failed to outpoll either of its two strongest rivals (or, in the context of an impending election, is considered highly unlikely to do so). The distinction is particularly significant in  two-party systems. In any case "third" is often used figuratively, as in "the third parties", where the intent, literally stated, is "the third and succeeding parties". The term "third parties" is used mostly in countries with first-past-the-post voting systems, as those systems tend to create a two-party system, so that successful smaller parties are rare.

Countries using proportional representation give little advantage to the two largest parties, so they tend to elect many parties. Therefore, in those countries, three, four, or more political parties are usually elected to legislatures. In such parliamentary systems, coalitions often include smaller parties; since they may participate in a coalition government, there is not a sharp distinction with a 'major' party. In two-party systems, on the other hand, only the major parties have a serious chance of forming a government. Similarly, in presidential systems, third-party candidates are rarely elected president.

In some categorizations, a party needs to have a certain level of success to be considered a third party. Smaller parties that win only a very small share of the vote and no seats in the legislature often are termed minor or fringe parties.

Parliamentary two-party systems 
Third parties usually have little chance of forming a government or winning the position of head of government.  Nevertheless, there are many reasons for third parties to compete. The opportunity of a national election means that attention will be paid to the positions of third parties. The larger parties might be forced to respond and adapt to their challenges, and often the larger parties copy ideas from them.  Most third parties try to build their support to become one of the dominant parties, as the Labour Party in Britain and New Democratic Party in Canada did.

In the Westminster system there is also the possibility of minority governments, which can give smaller parties strength disproportional to their support.  Examples include the Irish Parliamentary Party which pushed for Home Rule in Ireland in the late 19th century.

Challenging parties also usually appeal for votes on the basis that they will try to change the voting system to make it more competitive for all parties.

Structural barriers to power 
Third parties face an uphill battle in terms of electoral success due to incentives placed on voters by election algorithms. Even in instances where the potential supporter may align themselves most with a certain third party, in the face of overwhelming odds against impacting the election it makes more sense to just stay home or back a coalition party in compromise. These disincentives exist primarily in the United States perpetuating two-party rule and can be alleviated through adopting electoral reform measures in the form of voting system adaptations, which, predictably, are often backed by third parties and opposed by the primary parties.

In some countries like the United States, parties with low win probability also face frequent exclusion from major debates and media coverage and denial of ballot access as well as hamstrung campaign budgets.

United States 

In the United States, there have been numerous "third parties". The largest since the mid-20th century are the Libertarian and Green Parties.

United Kingdom 
In the United Kingdom, a third party is a national political party, other than the Conservatives and Labour, which has at least one member in the House of Commons. From 1922 to 2015, Liberal Democrats and its predecessor Liberals was the third party. Since 2015, it is used for the Scottish National Party. In Scotland, the SNP has been the dominant parliamentary party beginning with the 2011 Scottish Parliament election, with the Conservative the next largest party and Labour becoming Scotland's third party ever since.

Canada 
In Canada nearly 50+ active political parties exist throughout the nation with several of them at both the provincial and federal levels.

See also 
 Frivolous political party
 Vote splitting

References

Political parties
Types of political parties